Stupid was a short-lived grouping of constructivist artists, formed in Cologne in 1919. The founding members were Willy Fick, Heinrich Hoerle, Angelika Hoerle, Anton Räderscheidt, Marta Hegemann, and Franz Wilhelm Seiwert. 

The Stupid group aimed to address sociopolitical issues through an art of proletarian character. Seiwert and Räderscheidt had previously been active in the Cologne Dada scene, along with Max Ernst. Ernst later described Stupid as "a secession from Cologne Dada. As far as Hoerle and especially Seiwert were concerned, Dada's activities were aesthetically too radical and socially not concrete enough". Seiwert described the group's esthetic: "We are attempting to be so clear that everyone will be able to understand us."

Räderscheidt's studio was their base of operations, but by 1920 he had abandoned the constructivist style. The group exhibited together and issued a publication, "Stupid 1", before disbanding. Many of the members joined the Cologne Progressives group.

Notes

References
Crockett, Dennis (1999). German Post-Expressionism: the Art of the Great Disorder 1918-1924. University Park, Pa.: Pennsylvania State University Press. 
Dempsey, Amy (2002). Art in the Modern Era: A Guide to Schools and Movements. New York: Harry A. Abrams. 
Michalski, Sergiusz (1994). New Objectivity. Cologne: Benedikt Taschen. 
Anton Raederscheidt biography at www.raederscheidt.com
Spies, Werner and John William Gabriel (1991). Max Ernst collages: the invention of the surrealist universe. New York: Abrams. 

Stupid
Dada